Zvezdopad (meaning "Starfall" in Russian) is the 20th album by the Russian punk band Grazhdanskaya Oborona. The album was released on 20 March 2002 and consists of cover versions of classic Soviet songs.

History 
Plans to record an album called Zvezdopad have existed in Egor Letov's journals since 1994. Many original handwritten track lists can be found at the GrOb website. One of these track lists even called for a version of Telstar to be recorded. The album itself was recorded during 2000 and 2001. It was finally released on 20 March 2002 on XOP/Moroz Records.

The launch party was held at the club "Tochka" in Moscow on 20 and 21 March of that year. The first pressing of the album came in a digipack, containing an absurdist painting of a tree with houses on its branches on the front cover which would later be reused for the CD issue in 2010. The booklet for that issue contained a painting of an antelope in a forest which would later be used on the 2011 vinyl reissue. Future pressings, as well as the Ukrainian first pressing, had an image of the band standing in the snow. That was issued in a standard jewel case.

In 2010, the album was reissued by Wyrgorod, who added three bonus tracks: a track called "Zachem snyatsya sny", recorded in the Zvezdopad sessions with bassist Natalia Chumakova on vocals and live versions of "Solnce vzoidet" and the Kommunizm song Tuman, recorded live at an Egor Letov concert in Barnaul in 2003. The 2011 vinyl reissue included a version of "Karavella" with Chumakova on vocals, in a jazz pop style evocative of Norah Jones. When originally recorded in 2000, the songs were instrumentals - Chumakova recorded her vocals in September 2007 when remastering the album.

The tracks "Shla voina" and "Zachem snyatsya sny?" were previously included on the Egor i Opizdenevshie album Psychodelia Tomorrow in 2002.

Track list

References

External links 
 Zvezdopad at Discogs

2002 albums
Grazhdanskaya Oborona albums
Nostalgia for the Soviet Union